Kan may be :

Gan Chinese, a group of Chinese varieties spoken in Jiangxi Province
Kaansa language, a Gur language of Burkina Faso
Kaan language, an Adamawa language of Nigeria
Kan, a variety of the  Mbay language, a Central Sudanic language of Chad and the Central African Republic
Kan, a variety of the Guntai language of Papua New Guinea